Hessle and Hill Top is a civil parish in the City of Wakefield district of West Yorkshire, England. At the 2011 census the parish was grouped with the small neighbouring parish of West Hardwick, and a combined population of 138 was recorded.

Governance 
Until 1974, Hessle and Hill Top was part of Hemsworth Rural District. The parish still falls within the Hemsworth UK parliament constituency.

Nostell, a smaller village to the west, is grouped with Hessle and Hill Top as well as several other small parishes as a division of Wakefield City Council.

The parish
The earliest recorded date for the parish is 1066, referred to as Hessle, derived from  meaning hazel tree, under the administrative unit of Odgodcross and attributed to a Lord Alward in 1066 and then to Lord Mauger of Elington 20 years later.

In the 1870s, Hessle, previously known as Hasel, was described as
"a township in Wragby parish...4 miles E of Wakefield"
Hessle and Hill Top is a small parish largely consisting of green space and countryside, with the woodland and agricultural farm land making up roughly 95% of the total land use, however only 6.1% of the parish use these spaces.

Within the parish there are 66 dwellings. Five of them, dating between 1641 and 1810 are Grade II listed. The majority of households in the parish are three-bedroom detached or semi-detached properties.

Due to the parish's small size there are almost no local shops within the parish, however there are many other neighbouring settlements which do provide such services, the closest being Ackworth. There are two scenic walks that go through Hessle and Hill Top and the neighbouring parish of Ackworth, visiting most of both parishes' landmarks and places of interest.

The nearest railway stations are at Pontefract, Featherstone and Fitzwilliam.

Population

The population of Hessle and Hill Top has shown a decrease since 1881 from a total population of 296 to its current population of 138, according to the 2011 census, as part of a steady trend since the beginning of the 20th century. People aged 40 years old and over make up 73% of the population of the parish. Other indicators of an ageing population include the mean age being 45.6 years, 6 years older than the national average. The parish has an almost entirely white population, with only one person being of mixed race and the other 137 of white British descent.

See also
Listed buildings in Hessle and Hill Top

References

Civil parishes in West Yorkshire
Geography of the City of Wakefield